Szczęsne may refer to:

Szczęsne, Masovian Voivodeship, Poland
Szczęsne, Warmian-Masurian Voivodeship, Poland